Tony Maurel (born 21 April 1993) is a French professional rugby league footballer who plays as a  or on the  for the Limoux Grizzlies in the Elite One Championship and France at international level.

Maurel has previously played for Ayguevives, Belberaud Ramonville and the Toulouse Olympique Broncos and Toulouse Olympique in the Betfred Championship.

Background
Maurel was born in Saint-Léon, Haute-Garonne, France.

Career
On 22 July 2020 it was announced that Maurel would leave Toulouse Olympique.

References

External links
Toulouse Olympique profile

1993 births
Living people
France national rugby league team players
French rugby league players
Limoux Grizzlies players
Rugby league fullbacks
Rugby league wingers
Toulouse Olympique players